Yemenimde hare var is a Turkish and Anatolian Greeks folkloric tune (in çiftetelli or syrtos rhythm).

Original form
The original form of the türkü was popular in Istanbul .

See also
Fasıl
Ballos
Syrtos

References

Turkish music
Turkish songs
Greek music
Year of song unknown
Songwriter unknown